The Kraken galaxy is a hypothetical galaxy that is proposed to have collided and merged with the Milky Way around 11 billion years ago. The Kraken contributed at least 13 (9%) of the surviving 150 globular clusters to the Milky Way. Its existence was first proposed in 2020.

See also
 Sausage Galaxy, dwarf galaxy merged into Milky Way being its last major merger, cause for the Milky Way's thick disc and many halo stars.
 List of open clusters
 List of spiral galaxies
 Open cluster family
 Open cluster remnant

References

External links

Milky Way
Hypothetical galaxies